SITAONAIR is a company that enables airline passengers to use their smart devices including mobile phones and laptops for calls, text messaging, emails and Internet browsing.

The company is a fully owned subsidiary of SITA, originally incorporated as OnAir as a joint venture with Airbus in February 2005. In February 2013, Airbus sold its 33% final stake to SITA. The company is headquartered in Geneva, Switzerland, and sales offices in London, Singapore and Dubai.

Services
SITAONAIR offers services which aircraft operators can use together or separately:
 Flight Operations or Flight planning is the process of producing a flight plan to describe a proposed aircraft flight.
Internet OnAir is a Wi-Fi network which offers Internet access at broadband speed to passengers. 
Mobile OnAir is a cellphone service which offers mobile telephony, SMS and narrowband Internet access (56 kbit/s) and so allows passengers to make and receive calls on their mobile phones, send and receive text messages and emails and use the Internet. Airlines can restrict usage of these services at discretion enabling them to ban voice calls and allow only SMS and Internet access instead. Lufthansa is one airline following this restrictive approach due to passengers' alleged desire for quietness during flights.
Link OnAir is a managed network service that allows airlines to use the IP-based satellite connection used by the aforementioned services for other applications, such as supplying in-flight entertainment systems with news content or Internet access and providing mission-critical information and communication services to air crews.
OnAir Play' combines inflight connectivity with films, TV, live news, music, games, magazines and newspapers. Passengers have access to a full range of content including live news and sport, updated throughout the flight and can buy destination-based goods and services to ease their arrival.

All three services share the same satellite connection to the ground. SITAONAIR (then OnAir) was the first company to provide integrated GSM and inflight wifi services, with Oman Air as the launch airline in March 2010. SITAONAIR’s technology has been certified for use on many types of aircraft – both private and commercial jets including Boeing and Airbus – for short and long haul. In most cases, it is available for linefit or retrofit.

Inmarsat SwiftBroadband (L band) 
A satellite data unit (SDU) manufactured by Thales and branded TopConnect establishes a backhaul link to the ground through Inmarsat's SwiftBroadband geostationary satellite constellation operating in the L band around 1500 MHz which allows the use of electronically steerable antennas mounted atop the aircraft fuselage and encased within a fiberglass, RF-transparent radome
that have a low profile compared to systems operating in the Ku band or Ka band which today still require mechanically steerable antennas with a significantly higher profile. Thus drag and fuel costs are reduced allowing economical operation even on smaller aircraft like business or regional jets.
Inmarsat's SwiftBroadband system covers much of the planet except for the polar regions above −82 and below +82 degrees latitude and currently provides symmetric data rates of up to 432 kbit/s per channel dependent on signal quality and overall load on the satellite's spotbeam serving the corresponding geographical area. Currently the Thales SDU can bond two channels resulting in a maximum bandwidth of 864 kbit/s.

Inmarsat GlobalXpress (Ka band) 
SITAONAIR was appointed as distribution partner for Inmarsat's Global Xpress service in November 2011.

See also
Gogo Inflight Internet
Aircell
Swift Broadband by Inmarsat
Connexion by Boeing
AeroMobile

References

Bibliography
 OnAir Confirms Appointment Of Dawkins As CEO Jun. 2010
 European 25 Most Creative Companies July 2010
 Emirates to Equip 90 A380s For WiFi, Phone Calls, Web-Surfing Jul. 2010
 Interiors: OnAir Seeks New Ties For Qatar 787 Deal Sep. 2010
 Singapore To Equip A380s, 777s With Internet Access Oct. 2010
 Aircraft Bomb Finds May Spell End For Inflight WiFi Nov. 2010
 Upwardly Mobile Nov. 2010
 OnAir Wins Aviation Business Award At Middle East Ceremony Dec. 2010
 Is it really dangerous to use a cell phone on a plane? Jan. 2011
 OnAir Increases Connectivity with TAM Feb 2011
 TAM Expands Deal To Fit OnAir Connectivity To Airbus Feb 2011
 Dasnair's Falcon 7X passengers fully connected by OnAir in world first May 2011
 Lightweight inflight connectivity solution launched May 2011
 Singapore Airlines Economy-class innovation: Improved in-seat entertainment, Aug. 2011
 Inflight Wi-Fi revenues to surpass USD 1.5bn in 2015, Sep 2011
 British Airways' all-business class service to NY 'to be profitable within a year', Sep 2011
 British Airways' Business-Only Flights to New York Make Their Mark After two Years, Oct 2011
Aviation Week, Airbus To Line-Fit OnAir On Emirates A380 Dec 2011
Inmarsat set to further tap potentials of ME segments, Jan 2012
 A look inside Hong Kong Airlines' new luxury HK-London cabin, Feb 2012* Voice and video calls via Wi-Fi from 30,000 feet?, Feb 2012
 THAI Airways selects OnAir in-flight connectivity on new fleet, March 2012
OnAir targets first Global Xpress commitments, March 2012
OnAir Connectivity Enabled on Emirates A380 Fleet, March 2012
First deployment of OnAir/TriaGnoSys inflight connectivity solution through Scandinavian Avionics, March 2012
Why airlines have been slow to add Wi-Fi to intercontinental flights, March 2012
Hands-on review: Qantas' A380 in-flight wifi Internet trials, March 2012
TAM e Oi reduzem em 50% as tarifas para celular a bordo March 2012
Thai Airways to launch inflight Internet on new Airbus A380s, March 2012
Azerbaijan Airlines to Launch OnAir In-Flight Web Services Jan 2012
TAM Airlines se ratifica como la compañía con la mayor flota de aviones de Brasil Jan 2012
Singapore Airlines Airbus A380s get inflight Internet April 2012
Teddies to trinkets, airlines eye sales in the sky June 2012
 Garuda Indonesia plans inflight Wi-Fi for Australia flights
 OnAir backs FCC proposal to end US ban on inflight cell phone use
 OnAir Expands Presence in Africa, Middle East
 Qatar DOES want broadband after all
 Yes, You Can Use Your Phone On a Plane. Just Not to Talk

External links 
 

Companies based in Geneva
Companies established in 2005
Travel technology
Satellite Internet access